Lanark railway station is in South Lanarkshire, Scotland, and is managed by ScotRail and is the southern terminus of the Argyle Line.

The station is located on Bannatyne Street, Lanark, which is staffed part-time (open Monday-Saturday 06:20 until 20:25) and has a car park with 31 spaces, including two disabled bays.

History
Lanark station opened in 1855, as the terminus of a short branch line off the Caledonian Railway's West Coast Main Line. The eastern curve closed in the 1960s. 

There was another triangular junction closer to Lanark station itself, and this is just north of the golf course and the embankments are still clearly visible. (summer 2017)

These were the two curves leading from the Lanark branch towards Muirkirk and Ayrshire and Lanark racecourse halt of course. 

In 1974, the Lanark branch was included in the West Coast Main Line "Electric Scots" electrification project by British Rail.

Current services

Alternate services on this route formerly ran via  and all trains continued via the Argyle Line to the north west suburbs of the city, but following a recast of the timetable in the wake of the electrification of the Whifflet Line, these now run to/from High Level instead and run fast beyond Cambuslang.

There are no southbound or eastbound services, as the branch only has a northbound chord connecting it to the West Coast Main Line (WCML) at Lanark Junction. 

There have been calls for the southbound chord to be reconnected to allow direct services from Lanark to Edinburgh, although the route has subsequently been re-used for housing.

References

External links

Video and annotation of Lanark Railway Station

Railway stations in South Lanarkshire
Former Caledonian Railway stations
Railway stations in Great Britain opened in 1855
SPT railway stations
Railway stations served by ScotRail
Lanark